The List of Lithuanians and Catholics (LKS) was a political party in Latvia in the inter-war period.

History
The party contested the 1920 Constitutional Assembly elections, but failed to win a seat. The 1922 elections saw the party win a single seat. However, the party did not run in the 1925 elections, and failed to win a seat when they returned for the 1928 elections. Thereafter the LKS did not contest any further elections.

References

Defunct political parties in Latvia
Catholicism in Latvia
Lithuanian diaspora in Europe
Catholic political parties
Political parties of minorities in Latvia